Shoot to Kill is a 1960 British crime film directed by Michael Winner and starring Dermot Walsh,  Joy Webster and John M. East. It was Winner's first film as a director and featured Lynn Redgrave's first speaking role.

Plot

Cast
 Dermot Walsh as Mike Roberts  
 Joy Webster as Lee Fisher  
 John M. East as Boris Altovitch  
 Frank Hawkins as Neale Patterson  
 Zoreen Ismail as Anna  
 Theodore Wilhelm as Nikolai  
 Victor Beaumont as Nauman  
 Ronald Adam as Wood

References

Bibliography
 Robert Shail. British Film Directors: A Critical Guide. Edinburgh University Press, 2007.

External links

1960 films
1960 directorial debut films
British crime films
1960 crime films
1960s English-language films
Films directed by Michael Winner
Films with screenplays by Michael Winner
1960s British films